

1973

See also 
 1973 in Australia

References

External links 
 Australian film at the Internet Movie Database

1973
Australia
Films